Family Π is a group of New Testament manuscripts. Belonging to the Byzantine text-type, it is one of the textual families of this group. The name of the family, "Π" (pronounced in English as "pie"), is drawn from the symbol used for the Codex Petropolitanus. One of the most distinct of the Byzantine sub-groups, it is very old and the third largest. The oldest Byzantine manuscripts belong to this family.

Hermann von Soden designated this group by the symbol "Ka". According to him, its text is not purely Byzantine.

Codices and manuscripts
Soden included the following in this group of codices: Cyprius (K), Petropolitanus (Π), 72, 114, 116, 178, 265, 389, 1008, 1009, 1079, 1154, 1200, 1219, 1346, and 1398. Lake added to this group of manuscripts: 489, 537, 652, 775, 796, 904, 1478, 1500, 1546, 1561, 1781, 1816. Soden also associated Codex Alexandrinus with this group. Wisse lists about 150 witnesses of the family, but the majority of them belong to this family only in some parts of their text. The Peshitta, in the Gospels, represents this family.

Some manuscripts are related to the family: Minuscule 706. In the Pericope Adultera, Tommy Wasserman found Family Π to include 581, 1272, 1306, 1571, 1627, 1690, 1699, and 2463.

Some manuscripts represent this family in some parts: 2278.

Group profile 

According to the Claremont Profile Method group Π has following profile in Luke 1, 10, and 20:
 Luke 1:2 (1 reading) — παρεδοσαν ] παρεδοκαν
 Luke 1:8 (4) — εναντι ] εναντιον
 Luke 1:17 (12) — ετοιμασαι ] + τω
 Luke 1:22 (14) — εδυνατο ] ηδυνατο
 Luke 1:39 (30) — αναστασα δε ] και αναστασα
 Luke 1:44 (34) — εν αγαλλιασει το βρεφος ] το βρεφος εν αγαλλιασει
 Luke 1:61 (41) — εκ της συγγενειας ] εν τη συγγενεια
 Luke 10:1 (1 reading) — δυο δυο ] δυο
 Luke 10:2 (8) — οπως ] + αν
 Luke 10:6 (15) — εαν ] + μεν
 Luke 10:11 (22) — εις τους ποδας ] omit
 Luke 10:12 (23) — λεγω ] + δε
 Luke 10:16 (30) — ακουων υμων ] υμων ακουων
 Luke 10:17 (32) — οι εβδομηκοντα μετα χαρας ] μετα χαρας οι εβδομηκοντα
 Luke 10:22 (33) — παντα ] και στραφεις προς τους μαθητας ειπε παντα
 Luke 10:22 (38) — παρεδοθε ] παρα δεδοται
 Luke 10:32 (47) — ελθων ] omit
 Luke 10:32 (48) — ιδων ] + αυτον
 Luke 10:35 (53) — τι ] + δ'
 Luke 10:36 (57) — πλησιον δοκει σοι ] δοκει σοι πλησιον
 Luke 10:41 (63) — ειπεν αυτη ο κυριος (or Ιησους) ] ο κυριος ειπεν αυτη
 Luke 20:1 (2 reading) — εν τω ιερω ] omit
 Luke 20:1 (4) — αρχιερεις ] ιερεις
 Luke 20:3 (8) — υμας καγω ] καγω υμας
 Luke 20:3 (9) — ενα λογον (=TR) ] λογον ενα
 Luke 20:9 (19) — τις ] omit
 Luke 20:10 (23) — εξαπεστειλαν ] απεστειλαν
 Luke 20:12 (24) — και τουτον ] κακεινον
 Luke 20:14 (26) — διελογιζοντο ] διελογισαντο
 Luke 20:14 (28) — κληρονομος ] + δευτε
 Luke 20:19 (33) — υστερον ] + παντων
 Luke 20:19 (34) — τας χειρας ] την χειρα
 Luke 20:28 (50) — Μωυσης ] Μωσης
 Luke 20:34 (61) — γαμισκονται ] εκγαμιζονται (ΤR reads: εκγαμισκονται)
 Luke 20:35 (62) — γαμιζονται ] εκγαμιζονται (ΤR reads: εκγαμισκονται)
 Luke 20:36 (64) — εισι(ν) ] omit
 Luke 20:37 (65) — Μωυσης ] Μωσης
 Luke 20:41 (70) — λεγουσι(ν) ] + τινες
 Luke 20:44 (74) — κυριον αυτον ] αυτον κυριον
 Luke 20:44 (75) — αυτου υιος ] υιος αυτου.

See also 

 Family E
 Family Kr
 Family Kx
 Family K1
 Family 1424
 Family 1739

Νοtes

References

Further reading 

 
 J. Geerlings, "Family Π in John" (Salt Lake City, 1963)
 

Greek New Testament manuscripts